"I'll Be Home for Christmas" is a Christmas song.

I'll Be Home for Christmas may also refer to:

I'll Be Home for Christmas, an alternate name for the Norman Rockwell painting Freedom from Want
I'll Be Home for Christmas (1988 film), an American NBC Christmas drama film
I'll Be Home for Christmas (1998 film), an American Christmas family comedy film
I'll Be Home for Christmas (album), a 2009 album by Crystal Shawanda
I'll Be Home for Christmas (EP), a 2009 extended play by Sara Evans